Shamsuddin Amiri (born 12 February 1985) is an Afghan football player. The goalkeeper played for Kabul Bank FC and the Afghanistan national team. He is one of the most experienced players among the current Afghanistan national football team. In the June 2007 Amiri was given Afghanistan's best player of the year award at the age of only 22. He has scored only a single goal at club level, an extraordinary shot which was originally a goal kick. Taking the goal kick from the penalty spot, Amiri kicked it with such force that it soared the length of the pitch and went over the keeper's head in the other end and into the goal.

References

External links
Afghanistannewscener.com

Afghan men's footballers
Afghanistan international footballers
1985 births
Living people
Footballers from Kabul
Kabul Bank FC players
Association football goalkeepers